Gamble Run is a stream in the U.S. state of West Virginia.

Gamble Run was named after John Gamble, a pioneer settler. John Gamble was murdered on this stream in 1850 after visiting a friends house.

See also
List of rivers of West Virginia

References

Rivers of Tyler County, West Virginia
Rivers of Wetzel County, West Virginia
Rivers of West Virginia